also known as the Yokohama Museum of Cultural History is a history museum in Naka-ku, Yokohama, Kanagawa, Japan.

Its exhibition focuses on the culture and history of Kanagawa Prefecture.

It is located in the building of the former Yokohama Specie Bank.

See also

Yokohama Archives of History
Yokohama History Museum

References

External links

Official site

Museums in Yokohama
History museums in Japan
Ukiyo-e Museum
Museums established in 1967
1967 establishments in Japan